Sainte-Eulalie is the name or part of the name of several communes in France:

 Sainte-Eulalie, Ardèche, in the Ardèche department
 Sainte-Eulalie, Aude, in the Aude department
 Sainte-Eulalie, Cantal, in the Cantal department
 Sainte-Eulalie, Gironde, in the Gironde department
 Sainte-Eulalie, Limousin
 Sainte-Eulalie, former commune of the Lot department, now part of Espagnac-Sainte-Eulalie
 Sainte-Eulalie, Lozère, in the Lozère department
 Sainte-Eulalie, former commune of the Tarn-et-Garonne department, now part of Lapenche

As part of a name
Sainte-Eulalie-d'Ans, in the Dordogne department
Sainte-Eulalie-de-Cernon, in the Aveyron department
Sainte-Eulalie-d'Eymet, in the Dordogne department
Sainte-Eulalie-d'Olt, in the Aveyron department
Sainte-Eulalie-en-Born, in the Landes department
Sainte-Eulalie-en-Royans, in the Drôme department

Outside France
 Sainte-Eulalie, Quebec

See also
 Saint Eulalia (disambiguation)